Noonlight, formerly SafeTrek, is a connected safety platform and mobile app that can trigger requests to emergency services. Noonlight users can trigger an alarm by clicking a button. Users can also connect other smart devices to automatically trigger alarms for them.

The app is available for both Android and iOS devices. It has protected over 1 million users since 2013 and handled over 50,000 emergencies across the United States. Noonlight was developed by Zach Winkler, the company's CEO.

Background 
The app was created in 2013 at the University of Missouri in response to the high number of crime reports and the slow identification of the location of people making calls by 911 services. Winkler notes that "what most of us don't realize is that 9-1-1 really doesn’t have your location when you call them. It takes them up to six minutes sometimes to get a 300-meter accuracy reading of where you are". Noonlight is able to obtain users' exact GPS location within 5 meters in seconds of triggering the alarm.

In February 2017, SafeTrek was one among the top 25 promising Start Ups, according to CNBC.

Connected safety 
Noonlight originally started as a way to get students from one point to another safely, and now it allows users to connect other apps and smart devices through the Noonlight app. This creates a way for users to get help even when they are unable or unaware of the emergency by allowing the connected app or device to trigger the Noonlight alarm for them. This solution also sends first responders vital details to make them more aware of the situation and better prepared. Also, users who already have memberships through some of these connected devices now have access to the safety button or other safety features through Noonlight.

Downtown St. Louis Collaboration 
In 2016, Downtown St. Louis partnered with SafeTrek and offered a six-month free subscription to 4,000 downtown residents, available on a first-come, first-served basis. 

In 2018, the St. Louis MetroLink contracted with Noonlight to offer their riders access to Noonlight's safety app. Similarly, Washington University in St. Louis offers a free subscription to all students, faculty, and staff.

Data collection and analysis 

The data collected in the background is used to better assess the danger potential of specific areas throughout the U.S. and is sold to insurance agencies for individual user’s driving risk assessment  For example, data released by the Noonlight app showed an intersection of Southern Methodist University's campus where users of Noonlight feel most unsafe. The Noonlight team has worked alongside local police departments to create a complementary police dashboard which marks and tracks locations of users, as well as passes along vital information to first responders collected through connected apps and devices. The intention is that policy makers, agency leaders, and individuals can make better and more informed decisions, improve resource utilization, and ultimately prevent emergencies from happening in the first place.

References

External links 
 

Security software
Android (operating system) software
IOS software
Location-based software
Law enforcement in the United States
Proprietary software
Emergency management software
University of Missouri